Taxi is a 1953 American drama film directed by Gregory Ratoff and starring  Dan Dailey. It was distributed by 20th Century-Fox.

Plot
Taxi driver Ed Nielson is a bad-tempered bachelor who lives with his mother and owes money on his cab.

On a day when things are going wrong, Ed picks up a steamship passenger, Mary Turner, arriving from Ireland, and drives her in a roundabout way rather than directly to her destination. The meter reads $12 but she has only $5, angering Ed.

Mary is trying to find a man she impulsively married in Dublin but hasn't seen since, Jim, a writer. He is nowhere to be found. His publisher, Miss Millard, reveals that Jim has gone back to Europe to write and that Mary should go back as well.

The distraught Mary spends a dollar on a St. Anthony statue and prays for help. Ed loses it. When he drives her back to the ship, he discovers Mary has left an infant son there, which is why she desperately seeks Jim.

Ed takes her home. On television, the statue has been located outside St. Patrick's cathedral and Jim is among those interviewed about it. It's a miracle and Mary hurries there in Ed's taxi, only to learn that Jim was previously wed to Miss Millard, who wants him back. She has nowhere else to turn, but Ed finds love in his heart.

Cast
 Dan Dailey as Ed
 Constance Smith as Mary
 Mark Roberts as Jim
 Neva Patterson as Miss Millard
 DeForest Kelley as Fred (uncredited)
 Stubby Kaye as Morris (uncredited)

References

External links

1953 films
1953 drama films
American drama films
Films about taxis
Films set in New York City
Films scored by Leigh Harline
Films directed by Gregory Ratoff
Films with screenplays by D. M. Marshman Jr.
20th Century Fox films
American black-and-white films
1950s English-language films
1950s American films